Tornada e Salir do Porto is one of twelve civil parishes (freguesias) in the municipality of Caldas da Rainha, Portugal. It was formed in 2013 by the merger of the former parishes Tornada and Salir do Porto. The population in 2011 was 4,358, in an area of 29.53 km².

Villages 

Bairro Social
Campo
Chão da Parada
Reguengo da Parada
Casais Morgados
Mouraria
Casais de Salir do Porto
Bouro

References

Freguesias of Caldas da Rainha